Charles Gordon "Colin" Rodger (3 March 1909 – 26 May 1982)  was a Scottish footballer who played as an outside left.

Sometimes known as "Fally", he began his career in the Scottish Football League with Ayr United, where his form was solid enough for him to be selected for the Scottish Football League XI in October 1935. This drew further attention, and three months later he moved to England with Manchester City; he was a squad member as the club won the 1936–37 Football League title, but as he only made nine league appearances (contributing seven goals) it is not clear if he was awarded a medal.

After moving to Northampton Town (as part of a player exchange also involving Fred Tilson, Keillor McCullough and Maurice Dunkley who went the other way), Rodger's career was interrupted by the outbreak of World War II, during which he made guest appearances for several Scottish clubs including Partick Thistle, Dumbarton and Ayr United.

References

1909 births
1982 deaths
Scottish footballers
Footballers from Ayr
Ayr United F.C. players
Manchester City F.C. players
Northampton Town F.C. players
Ayr United F.C. wartime guest players
Partick Thistle F.C. wartime guest players
Dumbarton F.C. wartime guest players
Raith Rovers F.C. wartime guest players
Association football outside forwards
Scottish Football League players
Scottish Football League representative players
English Football League players